In French, elision is the suppression of a final unstressed vowel (usually ) immediately before another word beginning with a vowel or a muted h. The term also refers to the orthographic convention by which the deletion of a vowel is reflected in writing, and indicated with an apostrophe.

Written French 

In written French, elision (both phonetic and orthographic) is obligatory for the following words:
the definite articles  and 
 ("the boy"),  ("the girl")
 +  →  ("the tree"),  +  →  ("the church")
. ("I sleep") . ("That would be great.")
. ("I slept.") . ("It was great.")
but:  ? ("Did I imagine?"),  ? ("Is that useful?") 
. ("Jean shaves himself, sees her, phones me.")
. ("Jean shaved himself, saw her, phoned me.")
but: . ("Look at him one more time.")
the object pronouns  when they occur after an imperative verb and before the pronoun  or :
 . ("Put it, give me them, scram.")
 . ("Put it there, give me some, leave.")
the negative marker 
. ("She isn't talking anymore.")
. ("She won't stop talking.")
the preposition 
. ("Jean's father just left.")
. ("Albert's father just arrived.")
 (which has many different functions)
. ("What are you saying? That Jean does nothing but eat.")
. ("What did you say? That we only had one more week left.")
The conjunction  plus the pronouns  and 
 ("if she likes cats")
 ("if he/they like cats")

Elision is indicated in the spelling of some compound words, such as  "peninsula",  "today", and  "someone".

At the beginnings of words, the aspirated h forbids elision. 
Example: . 
The mute h, however, requires elision. 
Example: . 
Both types of "h" are silent regardless.

Informal French 
Elision of the second-person singular subject pronoun , before the verbs beginning with a vowel or mute h (silent h), and of the particle of negation , is very common in informal speech, but is avoided in careful speech and never used in formal writing:
 . "You decided to visit them, you went to see the film, you were not there, I don't know." (careful speech)
 T'as décidé de lui rendre visite, t'es allé voir le film, t'étais pas là, je sais pas. (informal speech)

See also
 Liaison (French)
 Elision — broader discussion of elision in other languages

References
 Maurice Grevisse, Le Bon Usage, 14th edition by André Goosse, de Boeck, 2007, 

French language
Silent letters

fr:Élision